The second season of Stargate SG-1, an American-Canadian television series, began airing on June 26, 1998 on Showtime. The second season concluded after 22 episodes on February 10, 1999 on British Sky One, which overtook Showtime in mid-season. The series was developed by Brad Wright and Jonathan Glassner, who also served as executive producers. Season two regular cast members include Richard Dean Anderson, Michael Shanks, Amanda Tapping, Christopher Judge, and Don S. Davis.

Production
Vaitiare Bandera, who plays Sha're, was actually pregnant with Michael Shanks' child during the filming of "Secrets". Following the events in the episode "A Matter of Time", Sally Malcolm would write two books, A Matter of Honor and The Cost of Honor, that detail SG-1's attempts to save SG-10 from the planet. The late Season 2 episode "Serpent's Song" was the first SG-1 episode that was directed by Peter DeLuise. He would go on to direct more episodes than any other director involved with the series, even passing Martin Wood, who began directing in Season 1. "Out Of Mind" was the second time a clip show has been used, the first being Season 1 episode "Politics".

Release and reception
"Holiday" gained a 4.2 rating on the Nielsen ratings, making it Stargate SG-1's strongest episode in its ten-season run. Stargate SG-1 was nominated for a Saturn Award in the category "Best Genre Cable/Syndicated Series". Richard Dean Anderson was honored with a Saturn Award for "Best Genre TV Actor". Daria Ellerman was nominated for a Gemini Award for "Best Picture Editing in a Dramatic Program or Series". The episode "Holiday" was nominated for a Gemini in the category "Best Achievement in Make-Up".

Main cast

 Starring Richard Dean Anderson as Colonel Jack O'Neill
 Michael Shanks as Dr. Daniel Jackson
 Amanda Tapping as Captain Samantha Carter
 With Christopher Judge as Teal'c
 And Don S. Davis as Major General George Hammond

The second season is the only one in which all five members of the original cast appear in every episode.

Episodes

Episodes in bold are continuous episodes, where the story spans over 2 or more episodes.

Home media

Footnotes

References

External links

 Season 2  on GateWorld
 Season 2 on IMDb
 

 02
1998 American television seasons
1999 American television seasons
SG-1 02
1998 Canadian television seasons
1999 Canadian television seasons